Sauk, or Ma Manda, is one of the Finisterre languages of Papua New Guinea.

Many works on this language have conducted by Ryan Pennigton, include a detailed grammar that was published 2016.

References

External links
 

Finisterre languages
Languages of Morobe Province